Glubokovo is a rural locality (a village) in Nagornoye Rural Settlement, Petushinsky District, Vladimir Oblast, Russia. The population was 346 as of 2010. There are 7 streets.

Geography 
Glubokovo is located 23 km southwest of Petushki (the district's administrative centre) by road. Pokrovskogo torfouchastka is the nearest rural locality.

References 

Rural localities in Petushinsky District